Barry Dudleston (born 16 July 1945) is a former first-class cricketer and umpire. He was a right-handed batsman and occasional wicketkeeper who played cricket for Rhodesia, Gloucestershire and Leicestershire. By the end of his career of 295 first-class games he had made 14,747 runs at 32.48, with 32 hundreds and 241 dismissals.

After his playing career ended he became an umpire and officiated in two Test matches and four ODI games. Along with John Hampshire, he umpired the last Benson and Hedges Cup final in 2002, thirty years after helping Leicestershire beat Yorkshire (including John Hampshire) by five wickets in the first Benson and Hedges Cup final in 1972.

Dudleston was one of ten members of Leicestershire's first County Championship winning team in 1975 to have a road in Leicester named after him by the city council. Chris Balderstone, Peter Booth, Brian Davison, Ken Higgs, David Humphries, Ray Illingworth,
Norman McVicker, John Steele and Roger Tolchard were the others. Jack Birkenshaw, Graham McKenzie and Mick Norman missed out as there were already roads using their surnames.

See also
 List of Test cricket umpires
 List of One Day International cricket umpires

References

External links
 

1945 births
Living people
People from Bebington
Gloucestershire cricketers
Leicestershire cricketers
Rhodesia cricketers
English Test cricket umpires
English One Day International cricket umpires
T. N. Pearce's XI cricketers